Terrance Watanabe (born 1957) is an American businessman and high roller who inherited Oriental Trading Company, a direct merchant of value-priced party supplies, arts and crafts, toys and novelties and school supplies founded by his father Harry Watanabe. Terrance was known for the large amounts of money he wagered at Las Vegas casinos.

Business background 
In 1977, Terrance Watanabe became president and part owner of Oriental Trading Company shifting the focus from carnivals to supplying party goods for churches, schools, retailers, and individuals.

In 2000, Watanabe sold his entire stake in the company to Los Angeles-based private equity firm Brentwood Associates, and resigned as CEO and President. He became a philanthropist, but subsequently lost most of his fortune gambling in Las Vegas.

Gambling habits 
After selling his company, Watanabe became known for his lavish gambling habits. In 2007, he was reported to have lost $127 million at Caesar's Palace and The Rio in Las Vegas after having gambled a total of $825 million. He was banned from Wynn Las Vegas for compulsive gambling. Watanabe is estimated to have lost approximately $204 million.

Caesars Entertainment Corporation was fined $225,000 by the New Jersey Gaming Commission for allowing Watanabe to continue gambling in a highly intoxicated state, though Watanabe's losses occurred in Las Vegas. Caesars alleges that Watanabe "was using marijuana and/or cocaine and made sexual advances toward employees". Caesars Rewards created a special tier for him known as "Chairman" which ranks above "Seven Stars". Watanabe received "tickets to the Rolling Stones, $12,500 a month for airfare and $500,000 in credit at the gift stores. Harrah's also offered 15% cash back on table losses greater than $500,000, special high-limit games and other incentives".

References 

1962 births
Living people
American people of Japanese descent
American businesspeople
American gamblers